Robert Hull is a TV writer and producer.

Robert Hull may also refer to:

Robert Hull (MP), English politician
Robert D. Hull (born 1954), American politician
Bobby Hull (born 1939), Canadian ice hockey player
Robert Hull (architect) (1945–2014), American architect

See also
Robert Hill (disambiguation)